2007–08 Albanian Cup was the fifty-sixth season of Albania's annual cup competition. It began in August 2007 with the First Preliminary Round and ended on 7 May 2006 with the Final match. The winners of the competition qualified for the 2008-09 first qualifying round of the UEFA Europa League. KS Besa were the defending champions, having won their first Albanian Cup last season. The cup was won by KS Vllaznia.

The rounds were played in a two-legged format similar to those of European competitions. If the aggregated score was tied after both games, the team with the higher number of away goals advanced. If the number of away goals was equal in both games, the match was decided by extra time and a penalty shootout, if necessary.

Preliminary Tournament

First Preliminary Round

|}

Second Preliminary Round

|}

Third Preliminary Round

|}

First round
The first legs were played on 27–28 November with the second legs between 2–5 December 2007.

|}

Second round
The first legs were played on 13 February with the second legs on 27 February 2008.

|}

Quarter-finals
The first legs were played on 5 March and the second legs were played on 12 March 2008.

|}

Semi-finals

|}

Final

References

External links
RSSSF Link

Albanian Cup seasons
Cup, 2007-08
Albania